Ohníč is a municipality and village in Teplice District in the Ústí nad Labem Region of the Czech Republic. It has about 700 inhabitants.

Administrative parts
Villages of Dolánky, Křemýž, Němečky and Pňovičky are administrative parts of Ohníč.

Notable people
Vera Salvequart (1919–1947), nurse and concentration camp kapo

References

Villages in Teplice District